The Ailsa Craig Lighthouse, is an active 19th century lighthouse located on Ailsa Craig, an island in the Firth of Clyde, just offshore from Girvan, South Ayrshire, Scotland.

History

It was completed in 1886, the construction being overseen by Thomas and David Alan Stevenson.

Initially, the lighthouse used oil-burning lamps, but by 1911, these were replaced with incandescent lighting.

Fog signals were discontinued in 1987. Then, in 1990, the lighthouse was automated, and a refurbishment took place in 2001, when it was converted to run on solar power.

Ailsa Craig is also known as "Paddy's Mile Stone" as it lies halfway between the cities of Glasgow and Belfast. As well as being a local landmark and a well known marine navigational hazard the island is a protected bird sanctuary, sheltering thousands of breeding pairs of sea birds. Other wild life found on and around the island are a colony of grey seals as well as the occasional whale, and more commonly large basking sharks during the summer months. The basking shark is a large but harmless shark: it can often be seen from boats feeding at the surface on the planktonic bloom which grows in great abundance around the British Isles during the warmer months.

In June 2018 the former lighthouse keepers' cottages, now derelict, were placed for sale by auction.

See also

 List of Northern Lighthouse Board lighthouses
 List of lighthouses in Scotland

References

External links

 Northern Lighthouse Board 
 Lighthouses For Sale Research Website

Lighthouses completed in 1886
Category B listed buildings in South Ayrshire
Lighthouses of Scottish islands
Category B listed lighthouses